The Disney Dream is a cruise ship operated by Disney Cruise Line, part of The Walt Disney Company. She is the third of the fleet, and first of its Dream-class. She currently sails four-day, and five-day cruises to the Bahamas and the Western Caribbean calling at Cozumel and Grand Cayman as well as Disney's private island Castaway Cay. In May 2023 the Disney Dream will sail across the Atlantic Ocean and begin sailings in Europe. The other four ships in the fleet are the Disney Magic, Disney Wonder, Disney Fantasy, and Disney Wish. She entered service in 2011; her sister ship, Disney Fantasy, was deployed in 2012.

History and construction
In February 2007, Disney Cruise Line announced that it had commissioned two new ships. The first steel cut, for scrollwork on the ship's hull, was in March 2009, at the Meyer Werft shipyards in Papenburg, Germany. Later that month the two ships were named, with Disney Dream set to enter service first, followed by her sister ship, Disney Fantasy.  The design of Disney Dream was unveiled at a press conference in New York City, on October 29, 2009.

The keel of Disney Dream was laid on August 19, 2009.  On June 1, 2010, the final section of the ship, the bow, was put into its place, completing the exterior, with work continuing on the interior of the ship. Float-out took place on October 30, 2010, and Disney Dream had her maiden voyage on January 26, 2011.

Disney Cruise Line took possession of Disney Dream on December 8, 2010. She arrived in Port Canaveral, Florida on January 4, 2011. Disney Dream was christened on January 19, 2011, by Jennifer Hudson, who began her career as an entertainer on Disney Wonder. Disney Dreams maiden voyage began on January 26, 2011, calling on Nassau, The Bahamas, and Disney's private island, Castaway Cay.

Since the ship's launch the Disney Dream has sailed almost exclusively on three and four-night sailings to Castaway cay and Nassau. It has now announced plans to debut itineraries for European destinations as of summer 2023. This will include the United Kingdom, France, Spain, Norway, Denmark, Greece and Italy. On June 7th, 2022, Disney Dream relocated to her new home port in Miami.

Design
Disney Dream has 1,250 staterooms, carries 2,500 passengers (double occupancy) or a maximum of 4,000 passengers, and a crew of 1,458. 

The ship has 14 floors, a black hull, white superstructure, twin red chimneys and yellow lifeboats. 

The ship’s interior includes a combination of art deco design, features from the world of Walt Disney and state-of-the-art technology. The interior cabins are fitted with virtual portholes ("Magical Porthole") that broadcast the view of the outside and animated Disney characters. 

Disney Dream’s art deco-style chandelier, located in the atrium, sparkles with thousands of hand-crafted crystal beads and glows with colorful glasswork. Crafted in Brixen, located in Northern Italy, the chandelier is 22 feet diameter at the ceiling plate and comes down 13 feet from the ceiling.  It is 24kt gold plated with a total of 88,680 Swarovski crystal beads ranging in size from 6mm to 12mm. 

Every Disney Cruise Line ship has an atrium lobby statue celebrating a classic Disney character; Disney Dream'sis Donald Duck portrayed as an admiral.

Recreation

On-board Activities
Activities aboard Disney Dream include: a 9 hole mini-golf course, a walking track, digital sports simulators, a full-sized basketball court that can be converted for use as a soccer pitch, volleyball court, or football/table tennis area. There are also two smaller sport courts and two hangouts for younger children.

The ship features the first water coaster at sea, called The AquaDuck, a 765-foot (233-metre) long winding waterslide with a four-deck drop and a course that winds over the edge of the ship and through the ship's forward funnel. The AquaDuck runs the width of the ship and the length between the funnels, almost the size of a U.S. football field. In addition to pools of various sizes, there are also hot tubs for adults & families, some of which have glass in the floor.

Entertainment
Disney Dream also includes two theatres:

 Walt Disney Theatre (1,340 capacity; live original productions)
 Buena Vista Theatre (399 capacity; motion pictures)

Among the leading-edge technical effects in the Walt Disney Theatre is an infrared camera with motion tracking, allowing the movement of performers to be blended with projected digital animated effects.

Rotational Dining concept
Every night of a Disney Dream cruise guests use a different restaurant. This is called "rotational dining". On a Disney ship guests rotate along with their servers which helps develop the relationship between diner and wait staff.

References

Bibliography

Ships of Disney Cruise Line
2011 ships
Ships built in Papenburg
Art Deco ships